Piazza San Giovanni is a city square in Florence, Italy.

Buildings around the square
Florence Baptistery
Palazzo Arcivescovile, Florence
Torre dei Lodi Focardi Marignolli
Opera di San Giovanni
Loggia del Bigallo

Gallery

Giov
Odonyms referring to religion